David S. Cass Sr. (March 21, 1942 – August 28, 2020) was a film director and stuntman. He directed Hard Time: The Premonition, Avenging Angel, Desolation Canyon, and Thicker than Water.

Cass began his film career as an extra. He alternated between acting and stunt work, starting with McLintock! (1963), on which he performed stunts. He went on to become a stunt coordinator and second unit director on Smokey and the Bandit Part 3, Knight Rider 2000, Walker, Texas Ranger and the Desperado TV movie franchise. He later focused on TV directing, with dozens of credits.

Filmography as actor

References

External links
 

1942 births
2020 deaths
American film directors
Deaths from cancer in California